Gabriel Rosenstock (born 29 September 1949) is an Irish writer who works chiefly in the Irish language. A member of Aosdána, he is poet, playwright, haikuist, tankaist, essayist, and author/translator of over 180 books, mostly in Irish. Born in Kilfinane, County Limerick, he currently resides in Dublin.

Biography
Rosenstock's father George was a doctor and writer from Schleswig-Holstein, Germany, who served as a medical officer with the Wehrmacht in World War II. His mother was a nurse from County Galway. Gabriel was the third of six children and the first born in Ireland. He was educated locally in Kilfinane, then in Mount Sackville, County Dublin.

He exhibited an early interest in anarchism and was expelled from Gormanston College (County Meath) and exiled to Rockwell College (County Tipperary). Later, he attended  University College Cork.

His son, Tristan, is a member of the Irish traditional music quintet Téada, and impressionist/actor Mario Rosenstock is his nephew.

Work
Rosenstock worked for some time on the television series Anois is Arís on RTÉ, then on the weekly newspaper Anois.

Although he has worked in prose, drama and translation, Rosenstock is primarily known as a poet. He has written or translated over 180 books.

He has edited and contributed to books of haiku in Irish, English, Scots and Japanese. He is a prolific translator into Irish of international poetry (among others Ko Un, Seamus Heaney, K. Satchidanandan, Rabindranath Tagore, Muhammad Iqbal, Hilde Domin, Peter Huchel),  plays (Beckett, Frisch, Yeats) and songs (Bob Dylan, Kate Bush, The Pogues, Leonard Cohen, Bob Marley, Van Morrison, Joni Mitchell). He also has singable Irish translations of Lieder and other art songs.

He appears in the anthology Best European Fiction 2012, edited by Aleksandar Hemon, with a preface by Nicole Krauss (Dalkey Archive Press). He gave the keynote address to Haiku Canada in 2015.

His being named as Lineage Holder of Celtic Buddhism inspired the latest title in a rich output of haiku collections: Antlered Stag of Dawn (Onslaught Press, Oxford, 2015), haiku in Irish and English with translations into Japanese and Scots Lallans.

Gabriel has worked with American photographer Ron Rosenstock, Indian Photographer Debiprasad Mukherjee, Greek photographer Kon Markogiannis, Dublin photographer Jason Symes, French photographer Jean-Pierre Favreau and many more to create the new guise of a photo-haiku (or a haiga) - the interplay of visual aesthetic and literature.

He also writes for children, in prose and verse. Haiku Más É Do Thoil É! (An Gúm) won the Children's Books Judges’ Special Prize in 2015.

Awards and honours
Member of Aosdána (Irish academy of arts & letters)
Lineage Holder of Celtic Buddhism
Former Chairman Poetry Ireland/Éigse Éireann
Corresponding Member Hellenic Authors’ Society
Member of the Board of Advisors to Poetry India
Tamgha-I-Khidmat medal (Pakistan) for services to literature.
Honorary Life Member Irish Translators and Interpreters Association
He taught haiku at the Schule für Dichtung (Poetry Academy), Vienna, and at the Hyderabad Literary Festival.

List of selected works
Poetry in Irish and Bilingual editions
Susanne sa seomra folctha. Clódhanna 1973
Méaram. An Clóchomhar 1981
Om. An Clóchomhar 1983
Nihil Obstat. Coiscéim, 1984
Migmars. Ababúna, 1985
Rún na gCaisleán. Taibhse, 1986
Oráistí. Rogha dánta agus dánta nua. Cló Iar-Chonnachta, 1991
Ní mian léi an fhilíocht níos mó. Cló Iar-Chonnachta, 1993
Rogha Rosenstock. Cló Iar-Chonnachta, 1994
Syójó. Cló Iar-Chonnachta, 2001
Eachtraí Krishnamurphy. Coiscéim, 2003
Forgotten Whispers / Cogair dhearúdta. 2003. (Haiku with photography by John Minihan) 
Krishnamurphy Ambaist Coiscéim, 2004
Rogha Dánta/ Selected Poems, translated by Paddy Bushe: CIC, 2005
Bliain an Bhandé/ Year of the Goddess.  Dedalus Press 2007
Margadh na Míol in Valparaíso/ The Flea Market in Valparaíso (new and selected poems) CIC 2014
Cuach ó Aois Eile ag Glaoch. Coiscéim, 2014
Sasquatch.  Arlen House, 2014
Chogyam Trungpa: One Hundred Haiku (Japanese Edition), with English and Japanese translations. Amazon Kindle edition, 2014
EVERY NIGHT I SEND YOU FLOWERS, Tanka in response to the art of Odilon Redon, bilingual. Cross-Cultural Communications, New York (ebook) 2020
The Road to Corrymore / Bóthar an Choire Mhóir, Ekphrastic tanka in Irish and English. Cross-Cultural Communications, New York (ebook) 2021
Mo Shaol Mar Scannán / My Life As A Film, a book length poem in praise of the movies

Criticism and essays
Ólann mo mhiúil as an nGainséis (My mule drinks from the Ganges). Cló Iar-Chonnachta, 2003 , 
Éist leis an gCruinne. Evertype, 2014, 
 A Doorstopper Anthology: Bone and Marrow. The poet's forensic examination of Bone and Marrow: An Anthology of Irish Poetry. In Academia.edu, an online repository of academic articles

Poetry in English
Cold Moon: The Erotic Haiku of Gabriel Rosenstock, 1993
Portrait of the Artist as an Abominable Snowman. Selected Poems, translated from the Irish by Michael Hartnett, and New Poems, translated by Jason Sommer,  Forest Books, 1989
Forgotten Whispers, 2003, with John Minihan. Haiku
Hymn to the Earth. The Silverstrand Press, 2004. (Poems and photography by Ron Rosenstock)
Uttering Her Name (poems to the goddess Dar Óma) 2010 Salmon Poetry 
The Invisible Light 2012 (Poems and photography by Ron Rosenstock)
Where Light Begins (haiku selection) Original Writing Ltd, Dublin, 2012
I Met a Man from Artikelly: Verse for the young and young at heart. Evertype, 2013, 
The Naked Octopus: Erotic haiku in English with Japanese translations. Evertype, 2013, 
Fluttering their way into my head: An exploration of Haiku for young people. Evertype, 2013, 
Duet of Waterfalls with Tatsuo Murata Japan Universal Poets Association  2015

Novel in Irish
Lacertidae. (Novella) Coiscéim, 1994

Translations
March hare, 1994. Short stories from the Irish language author Pádraic Breathnach
Full Moon: Ré Lán, Cló Ceardlann na gCnoc, 2010, Limited bilingual edition, Irish language translation of English haiku from the Nepalese haiku poet Janak Sapkota
Whisper of Pines: Cogar na nGiúiseanna, Original Writing 2012. Irish language translations of English haiku from the Nepalese haiku poet Janak Sapkota
The Moon over Tagoto (contribution to a new multi-lingual version of that classic of world literature by haiku master Buson) Beehive Publishers, 2015

Books in English
The Wasp in the Mug: Unforgettable Irish Proverbs. Mercier Press, 1993
Haiku Enlightenment (essay) Cambridge Scholars Publishing, 2005
Haiku, the Gentle Art of Disappearing Cambridge Scholars Publishing, 2005
The Pleasantries of Krishnamurphy Non-Duality Press, 2011
My Head is Missing 2012 (Detective novel)
The Partisan and other stories. Evertype, 2014, 
CHE: Haiku Glimpse K, with Tatsuo Murata, Mariko Sumikura Japan Universal Poets Association 

DVD
The Light Within (poetry, photography and soundscape, with Ron Rosenstock and Eugene Skeef)

Recorded Media
Video readings in the Irish Poetry Reading Archive, UCD Digital Library, University College DublinHaiku as GaeilgeTextbooksBeginner's Irish, Hippocrene Books, New York, 2005,  and 

References

External links
General links
Gabriel Rosentock at Aosdána
Poems of Gabriel Rosenstock in German translation (Poetenladen). 
Rogha Gabriel, Blog 
The LiederNet Archive -Lieder and art song translations
Review of Where Light Begins: Haiku Rimas Uzgiris in Haiku Society of America
Review of Margadh na Míol in Valparaíso: the Flea Market in Valparaíso: new and selected poems in Books Ireland Magazine
Review of Emptiness: photographs with haiku in English, Irish & Japanese Philip Gross in Long Exposure Magazine
Gabriel Rosenstock recites  Uaireanta is Fear Bréige Mé (Sometimes I'm a Scarecrow). With fellow-INNTI poet, Michael Davitt, 1988 (in Irish).
Thomas Goggin reviews Haiku Enlightenment in Academia
Review of Walk with Gandhi in The Wire.
Review of Walk with Gandhi in Culture Matters
4 tanka in Modern Literature online magazine (English language)
My Head Is Missing: A Kerry Detective Story audiobook
Préacháin Chill Fhíonáin / The Crows of Kilfinane A bilingual rensaku (haiku sequence)
A varied collection of articles and poetry by Gabriel Rosenstock (login required, but registration is free)

Free books
EVERY NIGHT I SEND YOU FLOWERS Tanka in response to the art of Odilon Redon. (ebook)
The Road to Corrymore / Bóthar an Choire Mhóir Ekphrastic tanka in Irish and English. (ebook) 
Rising Flame of Love Tanka in Irish and English with vintage Indian matchboxes. (ebook)
Broken Angels / Aingil Bhriste Bilingual ekphrastic tanka – poems of love, longing and emptiness – in response to artwork by various hands. (ebook)
Outskirts of the Mind / Ciumhais na hAigne Bilingual tanka, in Irish and English, in response to artwork by various hands. Mystic poems of love, longing and emptiness in 5-7-5-7-7 syllables. (ebook)
Secrets of Secrets / Rún na Rún Bilingual tanka, in Irish and English, in response to artwork by various hands. Mystic poems of love, longing and emptiness in 5-7-5-7-7 syllables. (ebook)
Brightening of Days Tanka in Irish, English and Croatian, in response to artwork by the Croatian painter Alfred Freddy Krupa. (ebook)
The Lantern/An Lóchrann Tanka in Irish and English, in response to artwork by various hands. (ebook)
Don Quijote in the Land of Shadows/Don Cíochótae i dTír na Scáileanna Haiku and senryū in Irish, English, Scots, Japanese, inspired by artwork. (ebook)
A Scent of Loneliness Haiku and senryū in Irish, English, Scots, Japanese, inspired by artwork. (ebook)
A Sweater for the Tayfel Haiku in Irish and English, a celebration of the art of Issachar Ber Ryback. (ebook - click image, then title)
Where Light Begins free online haiku book, English language, 2012
Ants are Rejoicing free online book of tanka in Irish and English, to artwork by Sonia Rodrigues Sabharwal, 2022
The Selborne Haibun after Gilbert White’s classic The Natural History of Selborne''; free online haibun in Irish and English, 2022
Léighleat A website created in 2022 containing a vast treasurehouse of kids' stories and poems in Irish, collected over a number of years.

1949 births
Living people
21st-century Irish-language poets
Alumni of University College Cork
Aosdána members
German–Irish translators
Irish Buddhists
Irish people of German descent
Irish poets
Writers from County Limerick
People educated at Rockwell College
20th-century Irish writers
20th-century male writers
21st-century Irish writers
21st-century Irish male writers
20th-century Irish translators
21st-century Irish translators
Irish children's writers
Irish-language writers
Translators to Irish
Haiku poets